Aifric is an Irish-language TV series aimed at young adults, co-created and written by Tadhg Mac Dhonnagáin and co-created and directed by Paul Mercier. The show has won multiple IFTA awards for "Best Children's/Youth Program".

The first of the weekly thirteen-part series began broadcasting on 31 October 2006, the date of TG4's tenth anniversary.

The series followed the life of Aifric whose wacky family have just moved to a new town in the West of Ireland. The 14-year-old wants nothing more than to fit in but feels her family will not make it easy for her. Her mother is a new-age hippy who has banned television, while her father is a wannabe rock star, and her little brother is annoying.

As well as on TG4, Aifric has also been shown on BBC Alba, where it was dubbed into Scottish Gaelic. It was also shown on HBO Latin America where it was dubbed into Portuguese and Spanish, and on Brezhoweb where it's been dubbed into Breton.

Characters

Trivia
 Over 95% of the production budget was spent in the Galway region.
 The production employed over 170 crew and a cast of almost 150 actors.
 In August 2004, there was a national talent search which auditioned hopeful teenagers for the many young roles in the show, including that of Aifric.

Awards and nominations
Aifric won best Children's/Youth programme at the 2007, 2008 and 2009 Irish Film and Television Awards, and was nominated for Best Irish Language show. It won best Youth programme at the Celtic Film and Media Festival, 2009

References

External links
 http://www.tg4.ie
 http://www.4rfv.co.uk/industrynews.asp?ID=53778

Irish-language television shows
Irish children's television shows
2006 Irish television series debuts
TG4 original programming
Irish teen drama television series
Television series about teenagers